Valses venezolanos (Venezuelan waltzes) is a compilation album by Aldemaro Romero and his hall orchestra, released in 1990 by the record label Fonográfica Gilmar.

Track listing

Aldemaro Romero albums
1990 compilation albums